Ion Apostol (born 21 August 1962) is a politician from the Republic of Moldova, deputy in parliament since 2010.

Biography
Ion Apostol was born on August 21, 1962, is a foreign languages teacher and director of "OPTIMAL Impex" SRL. In the parliamentary elections in 2009 he was on the list of candidates from the Liberal Party with number 19.

References

External links 
 Curtea Constitutionala a validat mandatele a opt noi deputati
 Site-ul Parlamentului Republicii Moldova

Romanian people of Moldovan descent
1962 births
Living people
Moldovan MPs 2014–2018
Liberal Party (Moldova) MPs
Moldovan MPs 2009–2010